The 2004–05 Scottish Premier League was won by Rangers, who claimed the title on the final day of the season by a single point from Celtic, who had gone into the final fixtures leading and were still ahead in the closing minutes of their last game against Motherwell until they conceded two goals (both scored by striker Scott McDonald), costing them the title with Rangers winning their match against Hibernian in Edinburgh. The dramatic events became known in popular culture as 'Helicopter Sunday' due to the aircraft ceremonially delivering the championship trophy changing direction in mid-flight as the identity of its winners altered suddenly.

As league champions, Rangers qualified for the UEFA Champions League, with runners-up Celtic also qualifying. Third-placed Hibernian qualified for the UEFA Cup, as did Dundee United, who took the Scottish Cup place despite losing the final to Celtic.

Dundee were relegated, and Scottish First Division winners Falkirk were promoted.

John Hartson was the top scorer with 25 goals for Celtic, whose manager Martin O'Neill stepped down at the end of the season after five years and a host of major trophies.

Teams

Promotion and relegation from 2003–04
Promoted from First Division to Premier League
Inverness Caledonian Thistle

Relegated from Premier League to First Division
Partick Thistle

Stadia and locations

Personnel

Managerial changes

League table

Results

Matches 1–22
During matches 1–22 each team played every other team twice (home and away).

Matches 23–33
During matches 23–33 each team played every other team once (either at home or away).

Matches 34–38
During matches 34–38 each team played every other team in their half of the table once.

Top six

Bottom six

Top scorers

Source: SPL official website

Attendances
The average attendances for SPL clubs during the 2004–05 season are shown below:

Source: SPL official website

Monthly awards

References

Scottish Premier League seasons
1
Scot